James Murray, known in the Polish–Lithuanian Commonwealth as Jakob Mura, was a Scottish emigrant to the Polish–Lithuanian Commonwealth who became a naval captain and shipbuilder in Poland during the reign of King Sigismund III Vasa. He built the galleon Król Dawid and in 1627, commanded it at the Battle of Oliwa.

References 

 Anna Biegańska, "James Murray: A Scot in the Making of the Polish Navy," Scottish Slavonic Review 3 (1984): 1-9
 

Polish Navy admirals
Scottish admirals
Scottish shipbuilders
Year of birth missing
Year of death missing
Scottish expatriates in Poland
16th-century Scottish people